AMZ Kutno is an automotive company based in Kutno, Poland, that has been operating since 1999. It specializes in the design and manufacture of special bodies for commercial vehicles, such as minibuses, ambulances, security vans and special vehicles for the uniformed services. The company also produces a line of city buses and various military vehicles.

Military products
 adaptation of Wolverine on a medical evacuation vehicle,
 adaptation Scam SM55 command vehicle,
 adaptation Scam SM55 for laboratory chemicals.

For most vehicles produced in the AMZ-Kutno armored cars are:

 Dzik (Boar) I/II/III, 
 Tur I, 
 Tur II, 
 Żubr

The Boar is produced in three versions for Polish uniformed services and export to Iraq. By February 2008 there were more than 600 units sold. In 2007 it joined the Tur I model in production, while in the 2008 model year they introduced the Zubr and Tur II models.

Civil products
Mini bus chassis have been produced since 2001. Mini-buses use chassis from: Ford, Iveco, Mercedes-Benz, Opel, Renault, and Volkswagen. Initially, only conversions were performed on buses. Over time, AMZ-KUTNO started to produce buses with their own, original construction on chassis vans or trucks.

After its initial growth, the production of buses began to decrease, due to the transfer of some employees to produce the model Dzik for Iraq. Bus sales in Poland were as follows: 2003 - 60 units, 2004 - 79 units, 2005 - 56 units, 2006 - 39 units, 2007 - 27 units. Export began in 2005 year. In subsequent years, it was: 2005 - 7 units, 2006 - 24 units, 2007 - 2 units.

Bus models:
 AMZ City Smile CS10E - electric city bus
 AMZ City Smile CS10LF - low floor city bus
 AMZ City Smile CS12LF - low floor city bus
 AMZ City Smile CS12 Electric - electric city bus
 AMZ LT46M - urban bus, based on VW LT46
 AMZ Transit - minibus, based on Ford Transit
 AMZ 50C13/15 - minibus, based on Iveco Daily 50C13/50C15
 AMZ 65C15 - minibus, based on Iveco Daily 65C15
 AMZ Vario - minibus, based on Mercedes-Benz Vario
 AMZ Movano - minibus, based on Opel Movano
 AMZ Master - minibus, based on Renault Master
 AMZ Sprinter RTW - based on Mercedes-Benz Sprinter
 AMZ Crafter 50 - custom body on a Volkswagen Crafter chassis
 AMZ 65C15 Ramzar - minibus, custom body on an Iveco Daily 65C15 chassis
 AMZ Boomerang - coach, custom body on a Renault Midlum chassis

Employment
At the end of 2006 onwards, employment in the company was about 350 people. In 2008 the number has risen to more than 400 employees.

References/Sources
 AMZ . AMZ. [w:] Ciężarówki Świata 2007, Nr 1 (15) 2007, s. 82. [in] 2007 World Trucks, No 1 (15) 2007, p. 82.
 Hołdanowicz G., Dzik - propozycja na czasie . Hołdanowicz G., wild boar - the proposal on time. [w:] "Raport Wojsko Technika Obronność", nr 11, 2004 . [in:] "Report of the army of Defense Technology", No. 11, 2004.
 Hołdanowicz G., Dzik 2 w Sulejówku i Wilnie . Hołdanowicz G., Dzik 2 Sulejówku and Vilnius. [w:] "Raport Wojsko Technika Obronność", nr 4, 2005 . [in:] "Report of the army of Defense Technology", No. 4, 2005.
 Hołdanowicz G., W Kutnie pojawił się Tur . Hołdanowicz G., appeared on The Kutno Tur. [w:] "Raport Wojsko Technika Obronność", nr 3, 2007, s. 44-46. [in:] "Report of the army of Defense Technology, No. 3, 2007, p. 44-46.
 Kiński A., Dzik-3 dla Iraku . Kinski A., Dzik-3 Iraq. [w:] " Nowa Technika Wojskowa ", nr 8, 2005 . [in] "New Military Technology", No. 8, 2005.
 Orłowski L., Samochód patrolowo-interwencyjny Dzik . Orłowski L., car-patrolowo intervention Dzik. Wyd. Ed. Bellona, Warszawa 2006, ss. 32. Bellona, Warsaw 2006, pp 32. Seria: Typy Broni i Uzbrojenia 222,  Series: Types of Weapons and Armaments 222,

External links

 
 "Dzików" 
 "TUR" Article
 Dzika III and Tura Gallery

Bus manufacturers of Poland
Electric bus manufacturers
Vehicle manufacturing companies established in 1999
Truck manufacturers of Poland
Electric vehicle manufacturers of Poland
1999 establishments in Poland